Serious is an album by American blues guitarist Luther Allison, released in 1987 on the Blind Pig label.

Track listing
All songs by Luther Allison, unless otherwise noted.

"Backtrack" - 2:51
"Life Is a Bitch" - 3:39
"Reaching Out" (Allison, Michael Carras) - 4:55
"Parking Lot" - 2:39
"Serious" - 5:06
"Just Memories" (Allison, Carras) - 6:00
"Should I Wait?" - 3:17
"Show Me a Reason" - 7:12
"Let's Try It Again" - 6:47
"We're On the Road" - 3:48

Personnel
Luther Allison - vocals, guitar, slide guitar
Samy Ateba - percussion
Michael Carras - keyboards
Jacques Higelin - piano
Frank "Fast Frank" Rabasté - guitar, backing vocals
Mario Satterfield - fretless bass
Jimi Schutte - drums, backing vocals
Jean-Pierre Solves - saxophone
Jean Louis Chautemps - saxophone
Alain Hatot - saxophone
Freddy Hovsepian - trumpet
Tony Russo - trumpet

References

1987 albums
Luther Allison albums